Anaphe aurea is a moth of the family Notodontidae. It was described by Arthur Gardiner Butler in 1892. It is found on Madagascar.

References

 Arctiidae genus list at Butterflies and Moths of the World of the Natural History Museum

Notodontidae
Moths described in 1892
Moths of Africa